The Lola T530 is a purpose-built Can-Am sports prototype, designed by British manufacturer Lola Cars in for the revived Can-Am series 1980. It was very successful, winning 7 of the 9 races in its first season of competition alone, and gave Patrick Tambay the championship with Carl A. Haas racing Team. Geoff Brabham won the championship in 1981; despite only winning 2 races. It was used in Can-Am racing until 1983. It was later used in the international Interserie racing series, and the British Thundersports racing series, between 1984 and 1988. Between 1980 and 1988, it scored a total of 32 race wins, and 43 podium finishes; a very impressive tally indeed. As with all other full-size Can-Am cars of the time, it used a mid-mounted 5-liter, naturally-aspirated, Chevrolet V8 engine. A total of 10 chassis' were built.

References

Sports prototypes
T530
Can-Am cars